Small Heath Leadership Academy is a co-educational secondary school and sixth form located in the Small Heath area of Birmingham, England. The school serves an inner-city area of Birmingham.

History
It was built as a Birmingham board school in 1892 by architects Martin & Chamberlain and is a Grade II* listed building. It later became the co-educational Waverley Grammar School, and then the comprehensive Small Heath School.

The school was awarded specialist Technology College status, and has been recognised as a High Performing Specialist School. It was awarded Raising Attainment and Pupil Progress mentor status in 2008, which recognises the school's work in raising students' achievement.

Small Heath School was previously located in two buildings on Muntz Street and Waverley Road. In September 2017 all students were located at Muntz Street.

Previously a foundation school administered by Birmingham City Council, in January 2018 Small Heath School converted to academy status and renamed Small Heath Leadership Academy. The school is now sponsored by Star Academies.

Academics
Small Heath Leadership Academy offers GCSEs and Cambridge Nationals as programmes of study for pupils, while students in the sixth form have the option to study from a range of A-Levels and Cambridge Technicals.

Notable former pupils

Waverley Grammar School
 Rowland Emett, cartoonist
 Di Trevis, theatre director

Sources
Pevsner Architectural Guides - Birmingham, Andy Foster, 2005, 
Victorian Architecture in Britain - Blue Guide, Julian Orbach, 1987,

References

External links
 Small Heath Leadership Academy official school site

Star Academies
Grade II* listed buildings in the West Midlands (county)
Secondary schools in Birmingham, West Midlands
Small Heath, Birmingham
Academies in Birmingham, West Midlands
1892 establishments in England
Educational institutions established in 1892